Uwe Dreher (13 May 1960 – 20 October 2016) was a German professional footballer who played as a striker throughout the late 1970s and 1980s.

Career
Dreher started out with Stuttgarter Kickers in 1978. He played there for five years, scoring 66 goals in 137 games, before signing for FC Basel in 1983. In 1986, he left for FC Schaffhausen but injury forced him to retire in 1989.  Since November 2007, he was coaching the German amateur club TSV Lustnau.

Dreher also played one game for the West Germany U21 national team. The game against the Netherlands in Mönchengladbach ended 1–1.

References

External links
 
 

1960 births
2016 deaths
German footballers
Association football forwards
Germany under-21 international footballers
2. Bundesliga players
Swiss Super League players
Stuttgarter Kickers players
FC Basel players
FC Schaffhausen players
German expatriate footballers
German expatriate sportspeople in Switzerland
Expatriate footballers in Switzerland
Sportspeople from Tübingen
Footballers from Baden-Württemberg